John Percy Baker  (9 February 1871 – 28 December 1947) was Archdeacon of Warrington from 1934 until shortly before his death.

Baker was educated at Kimbolton Grammar School, King Edward's School, Birmingham, Emmanuel College, Cambridge and Ridley Hall, Cambridge;  and ordained in 1894. He was a curate at St Aubyn, Devonport (1894–98) then St Andrew, Plymouth, (1898–1901); Vicar of Ellacombe (1901–09) then Mossley Hill  (1921–35); Prebendary of Exeter Cathedral (1920–34); and Examining Chaplain  to  the Bishop of Liverpool (1928–44).

Notes

1871 births
1947 deaths
People educated at Kimbolton School
People educated at King Edward's School, Birmingham
Alumni of Emmanuel College, Cambridge
Alumni of Ridley Hall, Cambridge
Archdeacons of Warrington